Clayton Anthony Blommetjies (born 30 August 1990) is a South African rugby union player for the  in the Pro14 and the  in the Currie Cup. His usual position is either full-back or wing.

Career
After representing Boland Cavaliers at youth level, he joined the Blue Bulls in 2009.

Blommetjies has made a total of 26 appearances in the Vodacom Cup and made his Currie Cup debut in the opening match of the 2012 Currie Cup Premier Division against Griquas.

Blommetjies has also represented UP Tuks in the Varsity Cup since 2009.

Blommetjies signed a deal with Bloemfontein-based side the Free State Cheetahs to join them starting 1 August 2014.

In 2018 Blommetjies had participated in the Guinness PRO14 against Ulster but since then had disappeared from public view.

On 9 April 2019 Blommetjies joined Leicester Tigers in England's Premiership Rugby competition on loan. After appearing twice for the club he returned to Scarlets.

References

External links
itsrugby.co.uk Profile

South African rugby union players
Rugby union fullbacks
Rugby union wings
Sportspeople from Paarl
Living people
1989 births
Blue Bulls players
Free State Cheetahs players
South Africa international rugby sevens players
South Africa Under-20 international rugby union players
Leicester Tigers players
Cheetahs (rugby union) players
Scarlets players
Stormers players
Western Province (rugby union) players